Mali competed at the 2019 African Games held from 19 to 31 August 2019 in Rabat, Morocco. In total, athletes representing Mali won two silver medals and two bronze medals and the country finished in 29th place in the medal table, shared with Libya.

Medal summary

Medal table 

|  style="text-align:left; width:78%; vertical-align:top;"|

|  style="text-align:left; width:22%; vertical-align:top;"|

3x3 basketball 

Gnere Dembele, Assetou Diakite, Aissata Maiga and Djeneba N'Diaye competed in 3x3 basketball and won the silver medal in the women's tournament.

Athletics 

Mali competed in athletics.

Issa Sangare competed in the men's 100 metres event. He did not qualify to compete in the semifinals.

Mustapha Traoré competed in the men's 200 metres event. He did not qualify to advance to the semifinals.

Koumba Sidibe competed in the women's 200 metres event. She did not qualify to advance to the semifinals.

Djakaridia Bamba competed in the men's 400 metres event. He did not qualify to advance to the semifinals.

Kadia Dembele competed in the women's 400 metres event. She did not qualify to advance to the semifinals.

Boxing 

Four athletes were scheduled to compete in boxing: Marine Fatoumata Colerte Camara, Zakaria Diarra, Daouda Sidibe and Ibrahim Soumare. Marine Fatoumata Colerte Camara won the bronze medal in the women's featherweight (-57 kg) event.

Chess 

Abdoulaye Coulibaly, Tenin Nato Diakite, Clarice Kone and Bakary Traore competed in chess.

Fencing 

Boubacar Ballo, Gaoussou Coulibaly, Keletigui Julien Diabate, Abdoul Kafar Kane, Mahamadou Samake and Souleymane Sanogo are scheduled to compete in fencing.

Football 

Mali's national under-20 football team and Mali's women's national under-20 football team competed at the 2019 African Games.

In the men's tournament the team finished in 4th place and in the women's tournament the team did not advance to compete in the semi-finals.

Judo 

Five athletes represented Mali in judo: Youssouf Diallo, Djeneba Konetio, Kante Lamine, Kadidiatou Maiga and Karounga Soumano.

Karate 

Awa Sacko, Amadou Diallo, Modibo Sacko, Souleymane Sinayoko and Mamadou Ouattara competed in karate.

Swimming 

Four athletes represented Mali in swimming.

Men

Women

Taekwondo 

Mali competed in Taekwondo. Seydou Fofana won a bronze medal in the Men's -74 kg event.

Tennis 

Abdoulaye Bagayoko and Seydou Diallo competed in the men's singles event.

References 

Nations at the 2019 African Games
2019
African Games